The Venetian regional election of 1995 took place on 23 April 1995.

For the first time the President of the Region was directly elected by the people, although the election was not yet binding and the President-elect could have been replaced during the term.

Giancarlo Galan (Forza Italia) was elected President of the Region over the centre-left candidate Ettore Bentsik (Italian People's Party), despite the presence of a third candidate, Alberto Lembo (Northern League).

Among party lists, the joint list formed by Forza Italia and the People's Pole (the right wing of the People's Party replaced Christian Democracy, which was disbanded in 1994, as the largest political force in the Region. Liga Veneta came second, while the Democratic Party of the Left, heir of the Italian Communist Party, had its best result ever in a regional election.

Electoral system
Regional elections in Veneto were ruled by the "Tatarella law" (approved in 1995), which provided for a mixed electoral system: four fifths of the regional councilors were elected in provincial constituencies by proportional representation, using the largest remainder method with a droop quota and open lists, while the residual votes and the unassigned seats were grouped into a "single regional constituency", where the whole ratios and the highest remainders were divided with the Hare method among the provincial party lists; one fifth of the council seats instead was reserved for regional lists and assigned with a majoritarian system: the leader of the regional list that scored the highest number of votes was elected to the presidency of the Region while the other candidates were elected regional councilors.

A threshold of 3% had been established for the provincial lists, which, however, could still have entered the regional council if the regional list to which they were connected had scored at least 5% of valid votes.

The panachage was also allowed: the voter can indicate a candidate for the presidency but prefer a provincial list connected to another candidate.

Parties and candidates

Results

Aftermath
After the election, Giancarlo Galan formed his first government, while Amalia Sartori (Forza Italia) was elected President of the Regional Council.

Elections in Veneto
1995 elections in Italy